Cook's Night Out is a 1937 British television series which aired on the BBC. It was a cooking show featuring Marcel Boulestin. The series consisted of five episodes, with Boulestin demonstrating how to make a different dish in each episode. The five dishes could be served separately, or form a five-course dinner together.

It was one of the very earliest cooking TV shows, though there had been radio cooking shows prior to this.

Boulestin continued to work on BBC TV, hosting "Dish of the Month" (1937) and "Foundations of Cookery" (1939).

No footage remains of the series, as it aired live, and methods to record live television did not exist until late 1947, and were used very rarely by the BBC until the mid-1950s.

References

External links
Cook's Night Out on IMDb

1930s British television series
1937 British television series debuts
1937 British television series endings
Lost BBC episodes
BBC Television shows
British cooking television shows
British live television series
Black-and-white British television shows